Stephen Keith Kloves (born March 18, 1960) is an American filmmaker. He wrote and directed the 1989 film The Fabulous Baker Boys and is mainly known for his adaptations of novels, especially for all but one of the Harry Potter films (the exception being Harry Potter and the Order of the Phoenix) and for Wonder Boys, for which he was nominated for the Academy Award for Best Adapted Screenplay.

Life and career
Kloves, born in Austin, Texas, grew up in Sunnyvale, California, where he graduated from Fremont High School.  He attended the University of California, Los Angeles but dropped out when he was not admitted into the film school in his third year. As an unpaid intern for a Hollywood agent, he gained attention for a screenplay he wrote called Swings.  This led to a meeting where he successfully pitched Racing with the Moon (1984).

His first experience with professional screenwriting left him wanting more interaction with the actors so that the characters would stay true to his vision.  Kloves wrote The Fabulous Baker Boys and also intended it to be his directorial debut.  After years of trying to sell the project in Hollywood, the film finally got off the ground and was released in 1989.  The Fabulous Baker Boys did reasonably well and was critically acclaimed, but his next shot as writer/director for Flesh and Bone in 1993 fared poorly at the box office. Kloves then stopped writing for three years.

Realizing that he had to return to writing to support his family, he began adapting Michael Chabon's novel Wonder Boys into a screenplay.  Kloves was offered the chance to direct but he declined, preferring to direct only his own original work. This was his first try at adapting another work to film.  His screenplay was nominated for a Golden Globe and an Academy Award after the film's release in 2000.

Warner Bros. sent Kloves a list of novels that the company was considering to adapt as films. The listing included the first Harry Potter novel, which intrigued him despite his usual indifference to these catalogs.  He went on to write the screenplays for the first four films in the series. However, he turned down writing the fifth film, stating that "The fourth film, Goblet of Fire, was really hard to do. I wrote on it for two years. But it’s not that simple and I don't know that I'll ever fully understand why I didn't do it." After Michael Goldenberg wrote the screenplay for the fifth film, Kloves then returned to write the sixth, seventh and eighth installments.

In 2011, Kloves was attached to work on a film adaptation of Mark Haddon's novel The Curious Incident of the Dog in the Night-Time.

Since 2016, Kloves produced the Fantastic Beasts films, a spinoff prequel series to the main Harry Potter series. Kloves co-wrote the third installment with J.K. Rowling.

Kloves produced the Andy Serkis-directed movie, Mowgli: Legend of the Jungle. His daughter, Callie, wrote the screenplay.

Filmography

Films 

Other credits

Attraction 

 2010: Harry Potter and the Forbidden Journey (written with Chick Russell)

References

External links

https://www.aglassofrain.com

1960 births
American male screenwriters
American film producers
Living people
Writers from Austin, Texas
Writers from Sunnyvale, California
Film directors from Texas
Film directors from California
Film producers from Texas
Screenwriters from California
Screenwriters from Texas